Gradište may refer to several places:

In Serbia 
 Veliko Gradište, town and municipality in Braničevo District
 Bačko Gradište, village in Bečej municipality
 Malo Gradište, village in Malo Crniće municipality
 Gradište (Bela Palanka), village in Bela Palanka municipality
 Gradište (Knjaževac), village in Knjaževac municipality
 Gradište (Merošina), village in Merošina municipality
 Gradište (Pirot), village in Pirot municipality
 Gradište (Vlasotince), village in Vlasotince municipality

Montenegro
 Gradište Monastery

In Croatia 
 Gradište, Croatia, municipality in Vukovar-Syrmia County

In Kosovo 
 Gradište (Binačko), fortress and archaeological site in Gjilan municipality

In Moldova 
 Gradiște, a commune in Cimișlia District

In North Macedonia 
 Dolno Gradište, archaeological site in Kočani Municipality
 Gradište (Skopje), known in ancient times as Tauresium, a fortified settlement from the early Byzantine empire
 Gradište, a village in Kumanovo Municipality

See also 
 Grădiște River, Romania
 Grădiştea (disambiguation) (Romanian form)
 Horodyshche (Ukrainian form)
 Hradiště (disambiguation) (Czech and Slovak form)
 Grodziszcze (disambiguation) (Polish form)
 Gradistë belt-plate, an Illyrian silvered bronze belt-plate found in the village of Gradistë in south-eastern Albania near Lake Ohrid
 Horodyshche (disambiguation)